Frederick H. Johnson was an American football coach.  He served as the head coach at South Dakota State University (1911) and Central Michigan University (1917).

Head coaching record

Football

References

Year of birth missing
Year of death missing
Central Michigan Chippewas football coaches
South Dakota State Jackrabbits football coaches
South Dakota State Jackrabbits men's basketball coaches